Sycacantha montana is a moth of the family Tortricidae. It is found in Vietnam.

The wingspan is about 22 mm.

References

Moths described in 2009
Olethreutini
Sycacantha
Moths of Asia
Taxa named by Józef Razowski